Self-portrait by Judith Leyster is a Dutch Golden Age painting in oils now in the collection of the National Gallery of Art in Washington DC.  It was offered in 1633 as a masterpiece to the Haarlem Guild of St. Luke. It was attributed for centuries to Frans Hals and was only properly attributed to Judith Leyster upon acquisition by the museum in 1949.  The style is indeed comparable to that of Hals, Haarlem's most famous portraitist.

In 2016 a second self-portrait was found, dating from around 1653.

Though Leyster looks very relaxed, the composition is to some extent an artificial confection. She is dressed in what must have been her best clothes, which in reality she is unlikely to have risked near wet oil paint. The figure she is painting is borrowed from a different work and was perhaps never actually painted as a single figure. 
 
Critics have found a sense of "Baroque closeness" in this painting. The artist and the viewer are very close in space. Many of the elements in the painting are foreshortened in order to feel closer and like they are coming into the viewer's space.

Background

Artist 
For women during this time, being a painter was unusual. Judith Leyster, however, was a working artist at the age of eighteen. She became the first successful woman painter in the Netherlands during the height of Dutch art, known as the Dutch Golden Age. She taught students while running her own workshop and selling her works. Leyster specialized in genre scenes, along with portraits and still lives. She would sign her paintings with a star because her last name translated to "leading star". Leyster was also the first woman member of the Haarlem painters' guild which was dominated by men. After her death, her artistic reputation became nonexistent and this painting was misattributed to Frans Hals.

Misattribution to Frans Hals 
It is unclear whether or not Leyster was a student of Frans Hals, but her style did share characteristics with his. This explains why some of her paintings were misattributed to him. The influence of Caravaggio, playing with dramatic contrasts between light and shadow, is seen in many of her works. The illusion of illumination along with soft, broad brushstrokes were shared by both Leyster and Hals. Both of their works included light, airy brushstrokes and similar subject matter. Leyster's work had been forgotten after she had died which led to the misattribution to Frans Hals.

Because she did not sign many paintings, art historians would misattribute those to Frans Hals or other male Dutch painters during that time. Her Self-Portrait was supposed to be executed in the 1620s by Hals and may have been among those sold as "Daughter of the artist" in early sales catalogs. In the eighteenth and nineteenth centuries, collectors and dealers often forged Frans Hals's signature on her paintings and covered up hers. The painting was sold by the Ehrich Galleries of New York on 9 May 1929 to Mr. and Mrs. Robert Woods Bliss, of Washington, D.C for 250,000 dollars. In 1928 W.R. Valentiner declared it a portrait of Leyster by Hals. In 1930 Gerrit David Gratama asserted that the painting was by Leyster herself, declaring that it was done while she was making a study of her painting, The Merry Trio.

Masterpiece 
Leyster entered into the Saint Luke's Guild of Haarlem as an independent master in 1633. This was rare, since women were excluded from joining the guild. Being a part of the guild was extremely important to be successful. It was extremely hard to sell artworks or have a studio where one can teach unless a part of this guild. Leyster even became a master in the guild. It was at the time she was applying to be a master that she created this painting as her "masterpiece." In this painting she is showing off her skills. She painted herself in a huge lace collar and silk sleeves which would have been extremely expensive and probably her best clothes. It is unlikely that she ever actually painted wearing these.  Like most sitters for portraits, she wanted to be shown at her best.  They also allowed her to show off her skill at depicting the different textiles. On the easel there is a  laughing fiddler in progress, a typical example of the sort of genre painting subject she mostly painted.

Description

Subject 
Continuing in the tradition of sixteenth-century artists who pushed to have painting seen as a profession as opposed to a craft, Leyster chose to depict herself wearing lace cuffs, rich fabric and a huge collar, which would not have been suitable for painting, but instead draw attention to her wealth and success. She also portrayed raw paint on her palette. This demonstrates her skill as an artist. In doing this, she both distinguished herself from less skilled artisans and showcased her technical abilities. While it is unclear whether Leyster studied under Hals, the loose brush strokes and casual pose echo his stylistic choices. Leyster shows herself working on a figure who appears in another surviving painting of hers, The Merry Trio.

Similar to other paintings of hers, Leyster's self-portrait has a momentary quality to it—she is turned partially to the viewer with her lips parted as if to speak. It has been said that her lips parted as if she was speaking is in reference to poetry and how the arts had a connection to that.  Leyster also paints herself with her arm propped up resting on the chair that mimics the casual and free confidence she had in her skill. She also is looking towards the viewer, as if to invite them into her studio. This, along with the fistful of brushes and inclusion of the fiddler from her later painting The Merry Trio, suggest that this piece was calculated to advertise her abilities. This is also another way of the artist letting the viewers know that she was capable of creating a portrait as well as creating genre scenes.

Composition 
According to Hofrichter, x-ray analysis shows that the figure on the easel was initially a portrait of a young girl, and that it would be in keeping with the tradition of other masterpieces of Leyster's day to show off her artist's expertise by changing this to show that she was also capable of painting figures in theatrical poses as well as portraiture. Instead of it being a self-portrait of herself creating a self-portrait, the artist chose to take another opportunity to display her skill and her success as a painter, incorporating a popular painting of hers.

On the whole, Leyster's painting is similar to self-portraits by other women artists. In depicting herself at her easel with an unfinished painting, holding both a palette and a paintbrush, she creates a self-portrait that recalls Catharina van Hemessen's 1546 self-portrait, as well as a self-portrait by Sofonisba Anguissola that dates to ca. 1554. What is unique about Leyster's self-portrait is where she places her own figure: both van Hemessen and Anguissola positioned themselves on the right side of the composition, the area known as the "heraldic left", considered appropriate for female figures. By contrast, Leyster places her own figure on the left side of the composition, or the "heraldic right", which was more suitable for male figures; this choice may reflect her status as a professional painter.

Exhibitions
 1937 — Frans Hals Tentoonstelling ter gelegenheid van het 75-jarig bestaan van het gemeentelijk Museum te Haarlem, Frans Hals Museum, Haarlem, no. 9, as by Frans Hals
 1993 — Judith Leyster: A Dutch Master and Her World, Frans Halsmuseum, Haarlem; Worcester Art Museum, Massachusetts, 1993, no. 7, as by Leyster
 2009 — Judith Leyster, 1609-1660, exhibition on the occasion of Judith Leyster's 400th Anniversary, National Gallery of Art, Washington, D.C.; Frans Hals Museum, Haarlem, 2009-2010

See also
List of paintings by Judith Leyster

Notes

References 

 Emden, Frieda. “Judith Leyster, A Female Frans Hals. Illustrated.” The Art World, vol. 3, no. 6, 1918, p. 501.
 Carr, Lisa. “Judith Leyster: A Leading Star Regains Her Luster.” Creative Woman, vol. 14, no. 1, 1994, p. 44.

External links

 Web pages on the painting at National Gallery of Art, Washington
 Self-Portrait, c. 1630, Judith Leyster

1633 paintings
Paintings by Judith Leyster
Collections of the National Gallery of Art
Self-portraits
Portraits of women
17th-century portraits
Musical instruments in art
Paintings about painting